Reduxer (stylised as REDUXER) is the first remix album by English indie rock band alt-J, released on 28 September 2018 by Infectious Music and the Canvasback Music division of Atlantic Records. It contains remixes of songs from their third studio album, Relaxer, done by various producers and featuring a number of different vocalists, mainly hip-hop artists.

Critical reception
Reduxer received a 66 on aggregator Metacritic, indicating "generally favorable" reviews.

Track listing
Credits adapted from Tidal.

Charts

References

2018 remix albums
Alt-J albums